Jonathan Adam Green (born 15 January 1980) is a former English cricketer.  Green was a right-handed batsman who bowled right-arm medium-fast.  He was born in Dunstable, Bedfordshire.

Green made his debut for Bedfordshire in the 2002 Minor Counties Championship against Cambridgeshire.  Green played Minor counties cricket for Bedfordshire from 2002 to 2003, which included 8 Minor Counties Championship matches and 3 MCCA Knockout Trophy matches.  He made his List A debut against Hertfordshire in the 1st round of the 2003 Cheltenham & Gloucester Trophy.  His second List A appearance came in the 2nd round of the same competition against the Netherlands, with both matches being held in 2002.  In his 2 matches, he didn't bat and with the ball he bowled took 4 wickets at a bowling average of 11.75, with best figures of 2/18.

References

External links

1980 births
Living people
People from Dunstable
English cricketers
Bedfordshire cricketers